The 106th New York State Legislature, consisting of the New York State Senate and the New York State Assembly, met from January 2 to May 4, 1883, during the first year of Grover Cleveland's governorship, in Albany.

Background
Under the provisions of the New York Constitution of 1846, 32 Senators and 128 assemblymen were elected in single-seat districts; senators for a two-year term, assemblymen for a one-year term. The senatorial districts were made up of entire counties, except New York County (seven districts) and Kings County (three districts). The Assembly districts were made up of entire towns, or city wards, forming a contiguous area, all within the same county.

At this time there were two major political parties: the Democratic Party and the Republican Party. In New York City the Democrats were split into three factions: Tammany Hall, "Irving Hall" and the "County Democrats". The Prohibition Party and the Greenback Party also nominated tickets.

Elections
The 1882 New York state election was held on November 7. Democrats Grover Cleveland and David B. Hill were elected Governor and Lieutenant Governor. The other two statewide elective offices up for election were also carried by the Democrats. The approximate party strength at this election, as expressed by the vote for Governor, was: Democratic 535,000; Republican 342,000; Prohibition 26,000; and Greenback 12,000.

Sessions
The Legislature met for the regular session at the State Capitol in Albany on January 2, 1883; and adjourned on May 4.

Alfred C. Chapin (D) was elected Speaker with 84 votes against 41 for Theodore Roosevelt (R).

On January 11, John C. Jacobs (D) was elected president pro tempore of the State Senate.

On March 14, the Legislature elected William B. Ruggles (Dem.) as Superintendent of Public Instructions, with 94 votes against 52 for Neil Gilmour (Rep.), to succeed Gilmour for a term of three years.

State Senate

Districts

Note: There are now 62 counties in the State of New York. The counties which are not mentioned in this list had not yet been established, or sufficiently organized, the area being included in one or more of the abovementioned counties.

Members
The asterisk (*) denotes members of the previous Legislature who continued in office as members of this Legislature.

Employees
 Clerk: John W. Vrooman
 Sergeant-at-Arms: John W. Corning
 Doorkeeper: Charles F. Brady
 Stenographer: Hudson C. Tanner

State Assembly

Assemblymen
The asterisk (*) denotes members of the previous Legislature who continued as members of this Legislature.

Employees
 Clerk: Walter H. Bunn
 Sergeant-at-Arms: James H. Delaney
 Doorkeeper: Jabez C. Pierce
 First Assistant Doorkeeper: Edward Hinch
 Second Assistant Doorkeeper: Edward Brodie
 Stenographer: Spencer C. Rogers

Notes

Sources
 Civil List and Constitutional History of the Colony and State of New York compiled by Edgar Albert Werner (1884; see pg. 276 for Senate districts; pg. 291 for senators; pg. 298–304 for Assembly districts; and pg. 381f for assemblymen)
 Sketches of the Members of the Legislatures in The Evening Journal Almanac (1883)
 THE NEXT ASSEMBLY in NYT on November 9, 1882
 CHAPIN FOR SPEAKER in NYT on January 2, 1883

106
1883 in New York (state)
1883 U.S. legislative sessions